Erik Østrand (12 May 1918 – 8 June 1989) was a Danish wrestler. He competed in the men's freestyle lightweight at the 1952 Summer Olympics.

References

External links
 

1918 births
1989 deaths
Danish male sport wrestlers
Olympic wrestlers of Denmark
Wrestlers at the 1952 Summer Olympics
Sportspeople from Copenhagen